Route 70 is a city route in Winnipeg, Manitoba, Canada.  It runs from Route 57 (Notre Dame Avenue) to Route 42 (Pembina Highway).

Route Description
The route has many street names along its length, listed as follows, north to south:

Street Names
Both Maryland and Sherbrook Streets were originally named Boundary and Milligan Streets.  Boundary Street ran along the original western boundary of Winnipeg before the city expanded westward to St. James Street in 1882.  Maryland Street is named after the Maryland estate that was formerly located on that road, which was owned by James Milligan, the namesake of Milligan Street.

Stafford Street is named after Ralph de Stafford, 1st Earl of Stafford.

Major intersections
From south to north:

References

070